Pierre Jean-Baptiste Rousseau (11 February 1905 – 1983) was a French essayist, epistemologist, astronomer and journalist who authored numerous popular science essays and articles. He helped promote hard science to the general public and advocated the development of fundamental scientific research in a "post-war disenchantment".

Biography

Early years 
The son of clerk assistant Jean-Baptiste Rousseau and Marie Renée Lefort, he was the oldest of three brothers. One of his brothers, René, died at the Battle of France and the other, Jean, volunteered as an airborne radio-operator in the Free French Forces before pursuing a career at Air France.

Rousseau was drawn to science as a child through reading a popular astronomy collection published by Théophile Moreux. A gifted student in mathematics who received departmental and national bursaries in 1918 and 1920, Rousseau built his first telescope at the age of 13 and published his first scientific paper at 17.

With the help of Jean Becquerel, he was appointed Assistant Boarding Master at the Montargis middle school in 1923. Despite his repeated attempts to be transferred to a city with a university in order to prepare his degree, Rousseau lived for several years between Fontainebleau, Blois and Vendôme.

After obtaining his first degree in General Mathematics in 1929, he was transferred to Paris at the Lycée Charlemagne and briefly to the Lycée Janson-de-Sailly before becoming assistant teacher at the Lycée Buffon. Rousseau then fulfilled his military obligation in 1931.

Certified in Advanced Astronomy in March 1932, he obtained two distinct degrees in Philosophy (Psychology, Morals and Sociology) and in Mathematics and Physics in 1935.

First publications 
While working toward his university degrees, Rousseau covered scientific news in several newspapers. His most significant articles were published in La Nature, a popular science magazine founded in 1873 by Gaston Tissandier. His experience as a popular writer fed his future works. His scientific columns earned him a significant number of letters from his readers.

Astronomy 
When asked to transfer to the Lycée Félix Faure of Beauvaisin 1935, Rousseau resigned from the Éducation Nationale without hesitation to join the Meudon Observatory as "Astronome Stagiaire au Service du Méridien" ("Trainee Astronomer at the Meridian Study"). At the time, French astronomy was under-developed compared to other western nations at the time (namely British, North American and Russian). The total staff of astronomers barely reached 150 in France, and the modernization project of the observatory, set in the Château de Meudon had just started; feeders and racks of the stables where the laboratories were installed had not yet been removed.

Audouin Dollfus, one of the most eminent astronomer in France, son of Charles Dollfus (creator of the Musée de l'Air and Honorary Astronomer at the Paris Observatory), remembers Pierre Rousseau as a young astronomer:

"Before the War, we were only a fistful. Pierre Rousseau was a modest person, almost too modest, deep, an excellent writer and an excellent popularizer. His books on astronomy are admirable! I read them avidly. To illustrate his Mars, Mysterious Earth, I think he obtained the images from the telescope of Antoniadi himself."

In 1939, Rousseau was enlisted and stationed in an artillery battery unit in Lorraine . He writes in Le monde des étoiles (The World of Stars - 1950); "Combien de fois l’auteur de ce livre ne l’a-t-il pas contemplé [Jupiter.]… pendant la dernière guerre, avec la modeste « binoculaire » de sa batterie ?" (How many times the author of this book contemplated, during the last war, [Jupiter] with his modest binoculars ?).

His first book on astronomy (L'Exploration du Ciel - Sky Exploration) was published the same year, at 8.0000 copies. It shows, early on, Rousseau's distinctive love for anecdotes and a particular care to underline the work of scientists and the importance of the history of science.

While focusing particularly on astronomy and related sciences, he was also interested in epistemology, astronautics, geology, nuclear physics, and electricity. His last book, L'avenir de la Terre (The Future of Earth) was published in 1977 by Nouvelles Éditions Latines.

Later life 
Through the 1950s and 1960s, Rousseau continued his work as a science journalist and popular science writer. His works were translated in several languages and have inspired some of his readers to become astronomers.
With his multiple experiences in various scientific domains and the history of science, Rousseau presented himself as a witness of the evolution of scientific progress in the eyes of the public opinion.
After the publication of his last essay, The Future Earth, he suffered a stroke at the end of the 1970s. Rousseau then progressively lost his physical and intellectual capacities until his death.

Works 
This list includes only the works published in France and a few foreign publications. The list and collection of his work for newspapers and magazines (La Revue de Paris, Historia, Nature, L’œuvre, Marianne, Le Petit Parisien, La Petite Gironde, Science et Vie) are difficult to obtain in its integrity, and are therefore not listed here.

With the exception of Que sais-je?, the works of Rousseau are not available in public libraries.

French editions 
 1939: Exploration du ciel, Hachette
 1941: Mars, Terre mystérieuse, Hachette
 1941: Pour comprendre l’astrophysique, Librairie Douin et Cie (Préface de l’Abbé Moreux)
 1941: De l’atome à l’étoile, Que sais-je ? 2, PUF
 1941: L’astronomie sans télescope, Que sais-je ? 13, PUF
 1942: La Lumière, Que sais-je ? 48, PUF
 1942: Histoire de la vitesse, Que sais-je ? 88, PUF
 1943: Notre amie, la Lune, Hachette
 1945: Histoire de la Science, Fayard
 1946: La conquête de la science, Fayard
 1947: La Terre, ma patrie, Fayard
 1948: Histoire de l’atome, Fayard
 1949: Histoire de la Terre. I, L’homme avant l’histoire and Histoire de la Terre. II, Jeunesse de la Terre  NEL (2 tomes)
 1950: L’énergie, Fayard
 1950: Jean-François, astronome, Hachette
 1950: Le monde des étoiles, Hachette
 1952: Notre soleil, Hachette
 1951: Découverte du ciel - L’Homme devant les étoiles. Tomme 1, NEL
 1952: Jean-François, électricien, Hachette
 1952: L’astronomie nouvelle, Fayard
 1953: Au cœur de la Terre, Hachette
 1954: La science au XXème siècle, Hachette
 1955: Exploration du ciel, Hachette
 1955: Glaciers et torrents - Energie et lumière, Hachette
 1956: A la conquête des étoiles, Hachette
 1956: Histoire des techniques et des inventions, Prix Maujean 1957 (Académie française)
 1957: Le monde des étoiles, Hachette
 1957: Satellites artificiels,  Hachette
 1959: L’astronomie, Livre de poche|Livre de Poche (Librairie générale française)
 1959: Histoire de l’avenir, Hachette, Prix Nautilus 1960
 1961: Ces inconnus ont fait le siècle, Hachette, Prix de l’Aventure industrielle et scientifique
 1961: Les profondeurs de la terre- Encyclopédie par l'image, Hachette
 1961: Les tremblements de terre, Hachette
 1961: Histoire des transports, Fayard, Prix Thérouanne 1962 (Académie française)
 1962: L’Univers et les frontières de la vie, Hachette
 1963: Voyage au bout de la science, Hachette, Prix Auguste Furtado 1964 (Académie française)
 1964: La science du vingtième siècle, Hachette (réédition couronnée par le Prix Jean Macé)
 1963: La lune, terre d’avenir, Hachette (refonte de Notre amie la Lune)
 1963: Voyage au bout de la science, Hachette
 1964: L’astronautique, Hachette
 1965: L'invention est une aventure, Hachette
 1967: Explication des paysages de France (La route Paris-Hendaye), Hachette, Prix Broquette-Gonin (literature) 1968
 1971: Histoire de l’avenir, Hachette
 1971: Le monde de l’électricité, Hachette
 1974: Survol de la science française contemporaine, Fayard
 1977: L’avenir de la Terre, NEL:

Some foreign editions 
This list does not include publications in the Eastern countries.

 1949: La conquista de la ciencia, Barcelona  Éditions Destino
 1956: Astronomia senza telescopio, Milano, Garzanti, collection Saper tutto 72, translated by Lea Magazzari
 1959: Man's Conquest of the Stars,  1st American Edition DJ Shelfworn.
 1959: Man's Conquest of the Stars, Jarrolds London, translated from French by Michael Bullock
 1959: Moderne uitvindingen, de techniek in de 20ste eeuw, Utrecht, spectrum 431
 1960: Sie prägten unsere Zeit - Die unbekannten Wegbereiter der modernen Technik, Bechtel - Verlag München
 1960: Geschichte der Zukunft, Paul List Verlag München
 1961: Man's Conquest of the Stars, WW Norton, NY
 1965: Os tremores de terra, Lisboa Editorial Verbo
 19xx: História das Técnicas e das Invenções
 1967: The Limits Of Science, Scientific Book Club
 1971: La vida extraterrestre, Éditions Bruguera

1905 births
1983 deaths
20th-century French journalists
20th-century French astronomers
People from Indre-et-Loire
Winners of the Prix Broquette-Gonin (literature)